Steven W. Williams is a Canadian businessman. He was the president and CEO of Suncor Energy from 2012 to 2019. He was COO from 2007 to 2011. Prior to joining Suncor as executive in May 2002, he was an executive at Innospec. Prior to them in 1995, he served for Esso.

In 2018, as CEO, Williams placed third out of 100 of the top earners in Calgary with a total compensation of $14,789,407 according to a Global Governance Advisors' survey posted by The Calgary Herald.

References

Year of birth missing (living people)
Living people
21st-century American businesspeople
20th-century American businesspeople
American chief operating officers
American chief executives of energy companies